Niemirowski, feminine: Niemirowska is a Polish-language toponymic surname meaning "from Nemyriv (now Ukraine)" or "from Niemirów (Poland)".  

As a Polish noble surname, it, together its variant, Niemierowski, belonged to the Trzaska coat of arms heraldic clan.

The Russian-language variant is Nemirovsky / Nemirovskaya, the Ukrainian one is Nemyrivskyi / Nemyrivskaya.

The surname may refer to:

 David Nemirovsky (born 1976), Canadian ice hockey player
 Irène Némirovsky (1903–1942), novelist of Ukrainian Jewish origin, who lived in France
 Leopold Niemirowski (1810–1883), Polish painter 
 Ludwik Bernstein-Niemirowski, Lewis B. Namier
Mikhail Nemirovsky (born 1974), Canadian-German ice hockey player
 Mordechai Nemirovsky, later Mordechai Namir
 Pascal Nemirovski (born 1962), French piano player and teacher
 Yael Nemirovsky (born 1944), Israeli electrical engineer

Polish-language surnames
Ukrainian-language surnames
Russian-language surnames
Polish toponymic surnames